Unilever Philippines, Inc. is the  Philippine subsidiary of British multinational company, Unilever. It is based in Bonifacio Global City, Taguig since 2016. It is a manufacturer of laundry detergents and soaps, shampoos and hair conditioners, toothpastes, deodorants, skin care products, household cleaners, and toilet soaps with an annual sales of over 40 billion pesos. It employs over 1,000 people nationally. It is the largest polluter in the Philippines.

Aside from Unilever Philippines, other Unilever subsidiaries in the country include Unilever RFM Ice Cream, Inc. (formerly, Selecta Walls, Inc.) and California Manufacturing Company, Inc. (Unilever Bestfoods).

Unilever Philippines serves as part of Unilever Group N.V./plc to produce, manufacture and supervise Unilever brands (like Surf, Close-Up, Clear, among others) in the Philippine market. To maintain the needs of mass production of most of the products, the company also imports Unilever products from neighboring countries such as Malaysia, Indonesia, Vietnam.

History
Unilever Philippines, Inc. was established in 1927 as Philippine Refining Company (PRC). The company began as an oil miller which at its peak produced nearly 100,000 tons of coconut oil annually. The quickly ventured beyond oil milling - margarine production in the 1930s, non-soap detergents, shampoos and toothpaste in the 1960s and 1970s and sulphonation technology and cogeneration power plant in the 1980s. The 1990s saw the company focusing on several improvements in the environment front one of which was the introduction of the first 100% biodegradable detergent bar in the Philippines.

Logo

In 1993, the company's name was formally changed from Philippine Refining Company (PRC) to Unilever Philippines (PRC), Inc.,  with a matching gold and platinum icon and a silver triangle to mark the name change. "Total Quality - Paglilingkod namin sa inyo" was the first tagline of the relaunched firm.

Unilever changed the format in 1997, where it created 2 flat tires shaped into a U, with a handwritten typeface and color blue icon, the brand is now developed by Total Quality for this real logo. The logo had been in use until June 2004.

The company started using the current Unilever corporate logo starting July 2004 and was designed by the brand consultancy Wolff Olins. It is composed of 25 icons woven together to create a U shape.

Marketing
Between early 1998 and mid-2009, each TV commercial of any Unilever brand it says at the end of commercial (with logo and voice over plus moments of silence, especially when it's on blue color on a white background): "From Unilever." Because the logo then was changed in 1997 and returned in 2020 after the Unilever-PRC logo to make a new image, the word "from Unilever" came from 1998. Later, the Unilever logo will appear after peeling in any edge in the end of the commercial, and currently using the "flip" after the commercial ends, starting in 2011. In 2020, the logo currently uses the "upward dice" version replacing the "flip".

Current brands
Axe
Best Foods
Block & White (acquired from Sara Lee Philippines in 2010)
Breeze (reintroduced in 2013)
Cif
Clear (introduced in the Philippines in 2007)
Close-Up	
Cream Silk
Domex
Dove 
Dr. Kaufmann (acquired from Sara Lee Philippines in 2010)
Eskinol (acquired from Sara Lee Philippines in 2010)
Fissan (acquired from Sara Lee Philippines in 2010)
Knorr
Lady's Choice
Lifebuoy (reintroduced in the Philippines in 2020)
Lipton
Love Beauty & Planet
LUX [reintroduce in 2022]
Master (acquired from Sara Lee Philippines in 2010)
Pepsodent
Pond's
Rexona
Selecta (joint venture with RFM Corporation since 1999)
Sunsilk
Surf
Toni&Guy
TRESemmé (introduced in the Philippines in 2012)
Unilever Pureit
Vaseline
Vitakeratin

Former brands
Comfort 
Dimension Multi-V 
Jif Powerful Cream Cleanser 
Lipton Iced Tea (powdered) 
Liqui-Fresh 
Lux 
Lux Super Rich Shampoo 
Milkrema 
Organics Shampoo 
Rave 
Rinso 
Royal Pasta 
Royco 
Signal 
Suave 
Sunlight 
Superwheel 
Tempo All-Purpose Detergent Powder 
Timotei 
Vaseline Soap 
Vaseline Shampoo 
Wheel

References

External links
 

Unilever companies
Manufacturing companies of the Philippines
Cosmetics companies of the Philippines
Personal care companies
Food and drink companies of the Philippines
Companies based in Bonifacio Global City
Philippine subsidiaries of foreign companies
Food and drink companies established in 1927
Condiment companies of the Philippines
Philippine companies established in 1927